Condition of the Heart is a studio album from Kashif, released in 1985, on Arista Records.

It may also refer to:
 "Condition of the Heart", a song from the 1985, Kashif album: Condition of the Heart
 "Condition of the Heart" (song), a song from the 1985, Prince album: Around the World in a Day

See also 
Heart condition (disambiguation)